Live – En Vivo Desde Mexico is a live album by Alacranes Musical. It was released on February 17, 2009.

Track listing
Intro
Solo En Ti
Vete Ya
Al Ritmo De La Lluvia
A Cambio De Que
La Hummer Del Año
Por Tu Amor
Si Te Vuelves A Enamorar
Un Idiota
El Teniente
Quebradita En El Mar
Por Amarte Así
Agustin Jaime

References

Alacranes Musical albums
Spanish-language albums
2009 live albums